Trenkwalder is a surname originating in Austria (Central Alps). 
The following people share this family name:
 Dominikus Trenkwalder (1841–1897), Austrian sculptor
 Elmar Trenkwalder (* 1959), Austrian painter and sculptor
 Hubert Trenkwalder (* 1971), Austrian musician and composer

Trenkwalder refers to:
 Trenkwalder Group, Austrian personnel services company 
 Trenkwalder Volley, the name of Italian volleyball club Modena Volley 2008-2010